Rahat is a predominantly Bedouin city in the Southern District of Israel. As such, it is the largest Bedouin city in the world, and the only one in Israel to have city status.

Rahat is one of seven Bedouin townships in the Negev desert with approved plans and developed infrastructure. The other six are Hura, Tel as-Sabi (Tel Sheva), Ar'arat an-Naqab (Ar'ara BaNegev), Lakiya, Kuseife (Kseife) and Shaqib al-Salam (Segev Shalom).

History
The region of the city was formerly owned by Al-Tayaha tribe (Al-Hezeel clan). Until the year 1972 the town was called "El Huzaiyil" before changing its name. In 1972 Rahat was considered by the government of Israel as a new settlement for Bedouin who lived in the surrounding area without permanent domicile. Until 1980, Rahat was part of the Bnei Shimon Regional Council and from then on (until 1994) it was a local council (administered by a private board until 1989). In 1994 it was recognized as a city – the first Bedouin city in Israel.

Urban development
The city has a total of 33 neighborhoods. All but one of the neighborhoods consist entirely of separate Bedouin clans, but one is a mixed-clan neighborhood. Between each neighborhood there is a wadi. The city also has a market, public and commercial services, neighborhood parks, public areas, women's employment centers, children's play areas, and several mosques.

Climate
Rahat has a semi-arid climate (Köppen climate classification: BSh).

Economy
The township is situated close to Beersheva so its economy is related to that of the city. There is an industrial park in the suburbs of Rahat, and another new park was founded on 2015 called Idan HaNegev. Several more industrial parks are situated in the area - Beersheba and Hura. Residents also work in the services industry in Beersheba. There are several organizations that promote entrepreneurship among the 210,000 Bedouin living in the Negev, primarily aimed at Bedouin women. One of them is Maof, and another one focused on finding jobs is called Rian.

In 2005 the city was one of the first to be connected to the WiMAX network.

In 2007 the Center for Jewish-Arab economic development initiated an entrepreneurship and employment project for Rahat residents. Approximately 40 Bedouin women took part in it and received training in job search, computer skills and business management. Twelve of them have launched their own businesses (shops, clothing, hairdressing, restaurant and catering, sewing).

In 2009 the city was unable to pay its water fees and the water supply was disconnected for five hours. Today Rahat has a water company that is in charge of supplying water and taking care of the sewers.

In 2006 Rahat collected 59% of Arnona taxes, making it the Arab city with the highest tax collection rate for the Arabic population for that year. In 2012 Rahat increased tax collection to 71%. In 2013 Rahat was collecting tax from its residents and also got 44% of a nearby industrial park.

In 2014 the rate of unemployment was 34%, compared to 14% in 2017. The shift has been attributed to a new industrial park, Idan HaNegev.

Culture projects

There are a number of organizations carrying out different activities aimed at supporting and facilitating entrepreneurship in Israel's South in order to further integrate the 210,000 Bedouin living in the Negev into Israel's mainstream economy. They are primarily aimed at Bedouin women.

Twenty Arab-Bedouin women from the towns of Rahat, Lakiya, Tel Sheva, Segev Shalom, Kuseife and Rachma participated in a sewing course for fashion design at the Amal College in Beer Sheva, including lessons on sewing and cutting, personal empowerment and business initiatives.

There is a volunteer program to teach English to the Bedouin schoolchildren of Rahat.

Social and Environmental Leadership Program was established in Rahat in the mid-2000s, initiated by young local residents.

Education

Since the city of Beersheva is in close proximity to Rahat, most Bedouin students from Rahat study at Ben-Gurion University of the Negev, some also at Sapir Academic College in Sderot. Soon a new Harvard University campus will be established in Rahat - inside Idan HaNegev Industrial Park. It will be the first campus built in this Bedouin city. Ben-Gurion University of the Negev will oversee the new campus' operations, and it will be considered a BGU branch.

Health and public services

Rahat as a city has a number of public services, including medical services, schooling, labor, shopping, etc. There are branches of several health funds (medical clinics) in Rahat: Leumit, Clalit, Maccabi and several perinatal (baby care) centers Tipat Halav. In 2004 a new police station was opened, and has around 70 staff policemen. There is a community center in Rahat with a number of clubs for youth.

Demographics

According to the Israeli Central Bureau of Statistics, in 2001 the ethnic make-up of the city was almost completely Arab Bedouin, without a significant Jewish population (see also: Population groups in Israel), making it the largest Bedouin settlement in Israel.  Rahat's society is considered a young one, as more than half of its residents are under the age of 18.

Members of several Bedouin family clans reside in Rahat:

Al-Tarabin: The ancient inhabitants of the Negev, their name Tarabin came the ancient Arabic name of the Negev region (Turban, تربان).
Al-Tayaha: The ancient inhabitants of Sinai, The word Al-Tiyaha means "the lost ones" in Arabic, their original home was the Al-Tih plateau in central of Sinai.
Al-Azazma: long with Al-Tayaha and Al-Tarabin are thought to be the indigenous pre-Islamic bedouins of Negev and Sinai. Probably related to ancient Arabians who inhabited the area like the Nabateans.
Al-Howeitat: from northwestern Arabia.
Al-Shorbagy: from Turkish Anatolian roots.
Al-Qrenawi: Turkish Anatolian-Arab tribal confederation originally from the city of Al-Qurein of Egypt.
Al-Tawarah: tribal confederation originally from the Al-Tur region in Sinai.

According to the CBS, in 2001 there were 16,300 males and 16,100 females. The population of the city was spread out, with 65.2% 19 years of age or younger, 15.8% between 20 and 29, 12.0% between 30 and 44, 4.7% from 45 to 59, 0.9% from 60 to 64, and 1.4% 65 years of age or older. The population growth rate in 2001 was 5.9%. Also according to the CBS, at the end of 2010 there were 26,700 males and 26,400 females. Some 60.4% of Rahat's population were 19 years old or younger, 15.4% between 20 and 29, 15.3% between 30 and 44, 5.9% from 45 to 59, 1% from 60 to 64, and 2% 65 years of age or older. The population growth rate has decreased significantly to 2.7%.

According to city's mayor the city is home to an estimated 7,000 illegal immigrants at any given time.

Tourism
Rahat is known to be a center of authentic food tourism and the city gets full with tourists from Israel and abroad especially in the Ramadan period. Most of the tourists like to be hosted in houses around Rahat where the lady owner of the house cooks traditional Bedouin food and tells stories about the Bedouin culture.

Transportation
In June 2007 a new Lehavim-Rahat Railway Station was opened. It serves both the Bedouin community of Rahat and the suburbs of Lehavim. It made it more accessible for the local residents to work and study in Beer Sheba and other parts of the country. There are buses operated by the Galim and Dan BaDarom bus companies. For a long period of time there were only private transit buses in the city, but in 2009 the bus transportation system was substantially improved and larger, national bus companies started to enter the city.

Archaeology
In 2019, one of the earliest rural mosques in the world was unearthed in Rahat, apparently dating to a century or two after the founding of Islam.

Notable people
Talal Alkernawi, Rahat Mayor in the past
Suleiman Al-Shafhe, a journalist, in the past a Channel 2 reporter covering the Palestinian issues
Ahmed Alansasra, an artist
Kamla Abu Zeila, a Bedouin female filmmaker creating socially aware documentaries
Yusra Abu-Kaff, a Bedouin filmmaker
Ahmad Amrani, one of the leaders of the Green movement. In 2002, established “Green Rahat,” the first environmental organization in Rahat to deal with the city's environmental problems
Jamal Alkirnawi, Founder of A New Dawn in the Negev which is providing education programme and help for Bedouin youth-at-risk
Amran El Krenawy (born 1996), footballer
Ouda Tarabin (born 1981), an Israeli Bedouin imprisoned by Egypt for illegal border crossing

Gallery

See also

Arab localities in Israel
Negev Bedouin
Sedentarization

References

External links

Rahat Photo Gallery
Back and Forth movie - an independent cinematic project in Rahat guided by Uri Rosenwaks including four documentaries made by four Bedouin film directors
Bedouin of the Negev
Rahat city General facts about Rahat, photos
Lands of the Negev, a short film presented by Israel Land Administration describing the challenges faced in providing land management and infrastructure to the Bedouin in Israel's southern Negev region
 Seth Frantzman, Presentation to Regavim about Negev

 
Cities in Southern District (Israel)
Cities in Israel
Arab localities in Israel
Bedouin localities in Israel
Populated places established in 1972
1972 establishments in Israel